Eremiascincus antoniorum  is a species of skink, a lizard in the family Scincidae. The species is endemic to Timor in Indonesia.

Etymology
The specific name, antoniorum, is in honor of the indigenous people of the island of Timor, who call themselves "the Antoni".

Reproduction
E. antoniorum is oviparous.

References

Further reading
Mecke S, Doughty P, Donnellan SC (2009). "A new species of Eremiascincus (Reptilia: Squamata: Scincidae) from the Great Sandy Desert  and Pilbara Coast, Westen Australia and reassignment of eight species from Glaphyromorphus to Eremiascincus ". Zootaxa 2246: 1–20. (Eremiascincus antoniorum, new combination, p. 8). (in English, with an abstract in German).
Mecke S, Kieckbusch M, Graf T, Beck LA, O'Shea M, Kaiser H (2016). "First captive breeding of a night skink (Scincidae: Eremiascincus) from Timor-Leste, Lesser Sunda Islands, with remarks on the reproductive biology of the genus". Salamandra 52 (2): 178–188. (in English, with an abstract in German).
Smith MA (1927). "Contribution to the Herpetology of the Indo-Australian Region". Proceedings of the Zoological Society of London 1927 (1): 199–225. (Lygosoma antoniorum, new species, p. 216).

Eremiascincus
Reptiles described in 1927
Taxa named by Malcolm Arthur Smith